Venanides is a genus of braconid wasps in the family Braconidae. There are about 14 described species in Venanides, found throughout much of the world.

Species
These 14 species belong to the genus Venanides:

 Venanides astydamia (Nixon, 1965)
 Venanides caspius Abdoli, Fernandez-Triana & Talebi, 2019
 Venanides congoensis (de Saeger, 1941)
 Venanides curticornis (Granger, 1949)
 Venanides demeter (Wilkinson, 1934)
 Venanides longifrons Fernandez-Triana & van Achterberg, 2017
 Venanides parmula (Nixon, 1965)
 Venanides plancina (Nixon, 1965)
 Venanides pyrogrammae (Nixon, 1965)
 Venanides supracompressus Fernandez-Triana & van Achterberg, 2017
 Venanides symmysta (Nixon, 1965)
 Venanides tenuitergitus Fernandez-Triana & van Achterberg, 2017
 Venanides vanharteni Fernandez-Triana & van Achterberg, 2017
 Venanides xeste Mason, 1981

References

Further reading

 
 
 

Microgastrinae